Gavin Brennan, (born 23 January 1988), is an Irish retired footballer who played as a midfielder in the League Of Ireland and NIFL Premiership.

Playing career

Drogheda United
Signing with Drogheda United on 1 July 2010 Brennan has become a revelation in the Drogs line up becoming the team's captain starting in 2014. He has a brother Killian Brennan who last played for St Patrick's Athletic, a brother Seán who last played for Drogheda United and a brother Ryan Brennan who plays for Shelbourne.

References 

1988 births
Living people
Republic of Ireland association footballers
Association football forwards
League of Ireland players
Drogheda United F.C. players
Shamrock Rovers F.C. players
Warrenpoint Town F.C. players